Aida is a 1953 Italian film version of the opera Aida by Giuseppe Verdi. It was directed by Clemente Fracassi and produced by Gregor Rabinovitch and Federico Teti. The screenplay was adapted by Fracassi, Carlo Castelli, and Giorgio Salviucci from the libretto by Antonio Ghislanzoni. The cinematography was by Piero Portalupi, the production design by Flavio Mogherini and the costume design by Maria De Matteis. The RAI National Symphony Orchestra was conducted by Giuseppe Morelli, the ballet was choreographed by Margherita Wallmann.

The film was screened out of competition at the 1987 Cannes Film Festival.

Plot

Cast

Yvette Chauviré and Léonide Massine are the dancers in the ballet with the Rome Opera Ballet.

Production notes
Renata Tebaldi was originally cast to play Aida, but she decided not to appear in the film. Gina Lollobrigida was also considered for the role, before Sophia Loren was cast. Loren claimed Lollobrigida turned down the part because Lollobrigida did not want to be dubbed by Renata Tebaldi, so Sophia took the role saying "I couldn't afford to be so proud". This was Loren's first leading role and her performance was met with critical acclaim for her role as Aida.

References

External links 
 

1953 films
1950s historical musical films
Opera films
Italian historical musical films
1950s Italian-language films
Films directed by Clemente Fracassi
Films based on operas by Giuseppe Verdi
Films set in ancient Egypt
Giuseppe Verdi
1950s Italian films